Kavadarci is a municipality in the southern part of North Macedonia. Kavadarci is also the name of the town where the municipal seat is found. Kavadarci Municipality is part of the Vardar Statistical Region.

Geography
The municipality borders Prilep Municipality to the west, Čaška Municipality and Rosoman Municipality to the north, Negotino Municipality to the northeast, Demir Kapija Municipality and Gevgelija Municipality to the east, and Greece to the south.

Demographics

According to the last national census from 2021 this municipality has 35,733 inhabitants. Ethnic groups in the municipality include:

References

External links
Official website

 
Vardar Statistical Region
Municipalities of North Macedonia